Hermenegildo de Brito Capelo (Palmela, 1841 – Lisbon, 1917) was an officer in the Portuguese Navy and a Portuguese explorer, helping to chart territory between Angola and Mozambique in southern Central Africa that was unknown to Europeans in the 1870s and 1880s. Alongside Roberto Ivens, he is famous for being the first European to cross Central Africa from coast to coast between Angola and Mozambique.

Hermenegildo Capelo later rose to become aide-de-camp to King Luis I of Portugal and afterwards to King Carlos I and, later still, vice-admiral. His military career ended in 1910 when King Manuel II of Portugal was exiled.

Early life
He was one of six brothers and his father was Major Félix António Gomes Capelo.

In 1860, Capelo sailed to Angola, in southwest Africa, and served on board the D Estefânia as a member of the Portuguese Navy, which was commanded by Prince Luís, staying for three years at a naval station before returning to Lisbon in 1863.  He sailed to Africa again in 1866, visiting Angola, where he remained until 1869.

Before returning to Lisbon in 1876, his travels took him to Mozambique, Cape Verde, Guinea and Qing Dynasty China.

Journeys of exploration
In 1875, Luciano Cordeiro, the founder of the Lisbon Geographic Society (Sociedade de Geografia de Lisboa) created the Portuguese National Commission of Exploration and Civilization of Africa, more commonly known as the Commission of Africa. Cordeiro's aims were to awaken public awareness of Portugal's African colonies and to raise funds by public subscription for the scientific-geographic expeditions necessary to define a single political Portuguese territory in Africa. These expeditions led to the recognition of the Kwango River and its relations with the Zaire River. They led also to the charting of the hydrographic basin of the Zambezi River, which helped to complete the map of southern Africa. By writing in defense of the Portuguese position in Africa, he helped to create a European expansionist movement, the Sociedade de Geografia de Lisboa.

The political motivation of these expeditions anticipated the historic Berlin Conference which took place in 1885. Explorers of all European nations had launched themselves into rivalry for territorial gains, compelling Portugal to urgently review its own colonial position and the effectiveness of its presence in Africa. Portuguese ambitions to incorporate the area between Angola and Mozambique into a larger Portuguese territory led to Britain issuing the British Ultimatum to Portugal in 1890.

Benguela and the lands of Iaca

Planning
Hermenegildo Capelo was chosen on May 11, 1877, to direct a scientific expedition into Central Africa alongside the marine official Roberto Ivens and Serpa Pinto. Under the auspices of the Sociedade de Geografia de Lisboa, this expedition aimed at "...the study of the Kwango river and its relations with the Zaire [Congo River] and with the Portuguese territories of the west coast...",  as well as exploration of the region south and southeast of the source of the Zambezi river and the Kunene river.

Expedition

On July 7, 1877, Hermenegildo Capelo, Roberto Ivens and Serpa Pinto set out, but later disagreed over the aims of the expedition. For Serpa Pinto it was to explore eastwards until they reached Mozambique. Capelo, however, saw it as an objective to reach Pretoria and possibly Durban in South Africa and the expedition divided. Capelo and Ivens explored the region of Bié and up to the lands of Iaca, having delimited the course of the Luando, Kubango and the Tohicapa rivers. On March 1, 1880, Lisbon received a triumphant communication from Hermenegildo Capelo and Roberto Ivens. The success of the expedition was recorded in the book De Benguela às Terras de Iaca (From Benguela to the Lands of Iaca).

From Angola to the coast of Mozambique
Following a consolidation of gains in the region of the Bié Plateau and the Zambezi river and reaching the Victoria Falls, Hermenegildo Capelo and Roberto Ivens were stimulated and keen to embark upon a second, ambitious expedition.

Planning
The necessity of creating a general atlas of the Portuguese colonies led Pinheiro Chagas, at the time Overseas Minister, to create, on April 19, 1883, a Commission of Cartography. One of its intentions was to map a commercial route between Angola and Mozambique. This objective was decided upon on November 5 and the commission proceeded to make the necessary arrangements. The choice of two marine officials for this important mission was complicated by the uncertainty of what they would have to face, thus making age, as well as mapping skills and enthusiasm, an important factor in the choice. Hermenegildo Capelo and Roberto Ivens were chosen to carry through this new exploration of Africa.

Expedition
Between 1884 and 1885, Capelo and Ivens explored between the coastline of Angola and the Huila plain and later through the interior of Quelimane in Mozambique. As they continued their hydrographic studies and observations of river flow and drainage patterns, but also taking notes on the ethnographic and the linguistic characters of the people they encountered, they established a long-sought-after route via land between the coasts of Angola and Mozambique, exploring the vast regions of the interior located between these two territories. Their achievements were recorded in a two-volume book titled: De Angola à Contra-Costa (From Angola to the Other Coast).

Capelo and Ivens began this expedition on January 6, 1884, and returned to Lisbon on September 20, 1886, where they were triumphantly received by King Luís I of Portugal.

Later career
Hermenegildo Capelo was made vice-president of the Overseas Institute, of which the first president was Queen Dona Amélia. His vision and his eminent skills at organization and direction were of great service to Portugal, alongside Roberto Ivens, Andrade Corvo, Luciano Cordeiro, Pinheiro Chagas, António Enes and Oliveira Martins. The Portuguese government recognized the value of these important contributions to Portuguese achievement.

Capelo became aide-de-camp to King Luis I and King Carlos I of Portugal and chief of the military house of King Manuel II, Plenipotentiary Minister of Portugal with the Sultan of Zanzibar and created a geographical map of the province of Angola.

Capelo was promoted to rear-admiral on May 17, 1902, and to vice-admiral on January 18, 1906. Dedicated to King Manuel II, Capelo accompanied His Majesty until he was exiled on October 5, 1910.  On the 24th of the same month, Capelo was dismissed and his military career ended.

Honours
In Oporto, a street and a metro station are named after him. He also appeared on the 1000 Angolan escudo banknote issued in 1956.

Bibliography
De Benguela às Terras de Iaca, 1881
De Angola à Contracosta, 1886

References

External links
 

1841 births
1917 deaths
People from Setúbal District
Portuguese admirals
Portuguese explorers
Explorers of Africa
19th-century explorers
Portuguese travel writers
19th-century Portuguese writers
19th-century male writers
Honorary Knights Grand Cross of the Royal Victorian Order